Parke Carroll (October 17, 1904 – February 4, 1961) was an American front-office executive in minor league and Major League Baseball.

Career

During those two years, he engineered trades that sent key players to the New York Yankees, such as Bob Cerv and Ralph Terry, but his most notable deal came on December 11, 1959, in which Carroll sent 25-year-old outfielder Roger Maris to the Yankees along with two other players for Don Larsen (author of a World Series perfect game three years earlier), Marv Throneberry, Hank Bauer and Norm Siebern. Only Siebern would pay dividends for the A's, however, as their regular first baseman from 1960 to 1963 and a two-time American League All-Star.

Carroll's dealings with the Yankees were controversial because the Athletics, under owner Arnold Johnson, sent many top players to New York in apparently one-sided trades during the mid-to-late-1950s. Johnson and the team's director of player personnel, George Selkirk, had previously traded quality players such as Bobby Shantz, Clete Boyer, Harry "Suitcase" Simpson and Ryne Duren to the Yanks. Johnson also had business ties with Yankee partner Del Webb and owned Yankee Stadium in the Bronx prior to purchasing the Philadelphia Athletics and moving them to Kansas City.  All these factors led to charges from fans, writers and other teams that Johnson and Carroll ran the Athletics as a Yankee farm team at the Major League level.

Carroll came to the Athletics directly after working in the Yankee organization as business manager for the Bombers' two top farm clubs, the Newark Bears of the International League, and the Athletics' immediate predecessors, the Kansas City Blues of the American Association.

A former sportswriter and sports editor of the Kansas City Journal Post, Carroll entered baseball as business manager of the Minneapolis Millers of the American Association when the Journal Post ceased publication during World War II. Carroll joined the Athletics in their first season in Kansas City in 1955 as vice president and business manager, and was promoted to general manager by Johnson after the end of the 1958 season. Johnson previously had not handed the general manager title to a specific executive, preferring to divide the GM responsibilities among himself, Selkirk and Carroll.

Death
Johnson died suddenly from a cerebral hemorrhage in 1960 while he was in Florida attending the Athletics' spring training preparations for the upcoming season. His unexpected death eventually forced the sale of the club to insurance executive Charlie Finley in December 1960. Finley then promptly replaced Carroll with former Cleveland Indians' executive Frank "Trader" Lane. Ironically, weeks later, Carroll, like Johnson, also died suddenly — in his case, of a heart attack in Kansas City, on February 4, 1961, at age 56.

External links
Baseball America Executive Database
Retrosheet.org - The Transactions for the 1959 Kansas City Athletics
Retrosheet.org - The Transactions for the 1960 Kansas City Athletics
Hardball Times - Mid-Season Blockbusters:  June (Part Two: 1949-1969)
Time.com: Friday, Feb. 17, 1961

References
Obituary, The New York Times, February 5, 1961.

1904 births
1961 deaths
Baseball executives
Kansas City Athletics executives
Major League Baseball general managers
Minor league baseball executives